Pinkvilla Style Icons Award was constituted in June 2022 as the first on-ground independent event of entertainment and lifestyle brand Pinkvilla. It rates and honors Indian achievers across the fields of film & television, business, sports, fashion, and politics among other sectors.

The first edition of the awards was held in Mumbai to commemorate 15 years of Pinkvilla’s inception. The event was attended by actors, sportspersons, political leaders, fashion models, fashion designers and entrepreneurs.

Maiden edition 
The maiden edition of the Pinkvilla Style Icons was held on 16 June 2022 at JW Marriott – in Juhu, Mumbai. Actors including Ranveer Singh, Kartik Aaryan, Kriti Sanon, Varun Dhawan, Kiara Advani, Sidharth Malhotra, Parineeti Chopra, Ayushmann Khurrana, Arjun Kapoor, Anil Kapoor, Sara Ali Khan, Janhvi Kapoor; cricketer Shikhar Dhawan, fashion designer Masaba Gupta, film director Karan Johar were among the guests who attended the event. Chief Minister of Meghalaya Conrad Sangma was also present to receive the award for the Super Stylish Politician. He was awarded by Pinkvilla CEO & Founder Nandini Shenoy. The event was hosted by former VJs Anusha Dandekar and Maniesh Paul.

Jury members 
With nominees spread across 35+ categories, the event was presided over by a panel of jury members namely Karisma Kapoor, Urmila Matondkar, Malaika Arora, Milind Soman, Ali Abbas Zafar, Vikram Phadnis, and Eka Lakhani. Two Reader's Choice categories were also announced & opened for public voting by Pinkvilla on its website.

Winners 
Winners of the first edition of the Pinkvilla Style Icons were

References 

Indian awards